Pamuluru is a village and panchayat in Kadapa district in the state of Andhra Pradesh in India.

Population

The total population of the village is 1371 containing 669 male and 702 female.

Education
It has a primary school, or elementary school and Z.P.H.S school, which are helpful in improving the literacy of the villages around.
and secondary  education also there

References

Villages in Kadapa district